St. Peter's Roman Catholic Church is a historic church on Ash Street in Lindsay, Cooke County, Texas.

It was built in 1903 and added to the National Register in 1979.

At first appearance, you would think that this is a stone church, much like the German immigrants that founded Lindsay would have attended in their home country. On closer examination, it is carefully painted (and maintained) wood.

The church is part of the Roman Catholic Diocese of Fort Worth.

See also

National Register of Historic Places listings in Cooke County, Texas
Recorded Texas Historic Landmarks in Cooke County

References

External links

Roman Catholic churches completed in 1903
Roman Catholic churches in Texas
Churches on the National Register of Historic Places in Texas
Buildings and structures in Cooke County, Texas
National Register of Historic Places in Cooke County, Texas
Recorded Texas Historic Landmarks
20th-century Roman Catholic church buildings in the United States